Pipestone County is a county in the U.S. state of Minnesota. As of the 2020 census, the population was 9,424. Its county seat is Pipestone.

History
The county was formed on May 23, 1857, by act of the territorial legislature, but was not organized at that time. The area was first designated Rock County while the name Pipestone County was attached to neighboring Rock County. An act of the Minnesota state legislature on February 20, 1862, swapped the designations, attaching the present names to the present counties, due to the pipestone quarry in this county.

Pipestone County organization was effected by a state act on January 27, 1879, with Pipestone City (which had been platted in 1876) as the county seat (the name of the county seat was later shortened to Pipestone). The pipestones are from deposits of red pipestone Native Americans used to make pipes.

Pipestone National Monument is in the county, just north of the town of Pipestone.

Geography
Pipestone County lies on Minnesota's border with South Dakota. The Rock River rises in the county and flows southward into Rock County, being augmented by the East Branch of the Rock River near the southern border. The terrain consists of low rolling hills, carved by drainages. The area is devoted to agriculture. The terrain slopes to the west and south, with its highest point on the upper part of its eastern border, at 1,883' (574m) ASL. The highest point in the eastern part of the county may be as stated but the highest summit is 1995 ft at 44.1927°, -96.2033°

Major highways

  U.S. Highway 75
  Minnesota State Highway 23
  Minnesota State Highway 30
  Minnesota State Highway 269

Adjacent counties

 Lincoln County - north
 Lyon County - northeast
 Murray County - east
 Rock County - south
 Minnehaha County, South Dakota - southwest
 Moody County, South Dakota - west
 Brookings County, South Dakota - northwest

Protected areas

 Altona State Wildlife Management Area
 Burke State Wildlife Management Area
 Holland State Wildlife Management Area
 Pheasant Terrace State Wildlife Management Area
 Pipestone Indian State Wildlife Management Area (within Pipestone Natl Monument)
 Pipestone National Monument
 Prairie Coteau Scientific and Natural Area
 Split Rock Creek State Park
 Troy State Wildlife Management Area
 Van Beek State Wildlife Management Area
 Woodstock State Wildlife Management Area

Lakes
Pipestone County is one of only four Minnesota counties without a natural lake, the other three being Mower, Olmsted and Rock. It does contain manmade reservoirs:
 Indian Lake
 Split Rock Lake: in Split Rock Creek State Park

Demographics

2000 census
As of the 2000 census, there were 9,895 people, 4,069 households, and 2,726 families in the county. The population density was 21.3/sqmi (8.22/km2). There were 4,434 housing units at an average density of 9.54/sqmi (3.68/km2). The racial makeup of the county was 96.68% White, 0.17% Black or African American, 1.48% Native American, 0.46% Asian, 0.02% Pacific Islander, 0.26% from other races, and 0.93% from two or more races. 0.70% of the population were Hispanic or Latino of any race. 35.7% were of German, 24.8% Dutch and 14.3% Norwegian ancestry.

There were 4,069 households, of which 31.0% had children under age 18 living with them, 57.6% were married couples living together, 6.5% had a female householder with no husband present, and 33.0% were non-families. 30.1% of all households were made up of individuals, and 17.2% had someone living alone who was 65 or older. The average household size was 2.38 and the average family size was 2.96.

The county population contained 25.8% under age 18, 6.8% from 18 to 24, 24.6% from 25 to 44, 21.4% from 45 to 64, and 21.3% who were 65 or older. The median age was 40. For every 100 females there were 92.8 males. For every 100 females 18 and over, there were 89.4 males.

The median income for a household in the county was $31,909, and the median income for a family was $40,133. Males had a median income of $27,642 versus $20,759 for females. The per capita income for the county was $16,450. About 7.8% of families and 9.5% of the population were below the poverty line, including 11.2% of those under 18 and 11.1% of those 65 or older.

2020 Census

Communities

Cities

 Edgerton
 Hatfield
 Holland
 Ihlen
 Jasper (partly in Rock County)
 Pipestone (county seat)
 Ruthton
 Trosky
 Woodstock

Unincorporated communities

 Airlie
 Cazenovia
 Cresson
 Diamond Corner

Townships

 Aetna Township
 Altona Township
 Burke Township
 Eden Township
 Elmer Township
 Fountain Prairie Township
 Grange Township
 Gray Township
 Osborne Township
 Rock Township
 Sweet Township
 Troy Township

Government and politics
In recent decades Pipestone County has trended Republican. In no presidential election since 1976 has the county selected the Democratic nominee (as of 2020). In 2012 it was one of only two counties not to vote for Democratic U.S. Senate candidate Amy Klobuchar.

See also
 National Register of Historic Places listings in Pipestone County, Minnesota

References

External links
 Pipestone County government’s website

 
Minnesota counties
1879 establishments in Minnesota
Populated places established in 1879